Scymnobius is a genus of lady beetles in the family Coccinellidae, formerly in the genus Nephus.

Species

References

Coccinellidae genera